Maurice De Coster (born 20 April 1890, date of death unknown) was a Belgian footballer. He played in five matches for the Belgium national football team from 1913 to 1914.

References

External links
 

1890 births
Year of death missing
Belgian footballers
Belgium international footballers
Place of birth missing
Association football midfielders